Javier Martínez (born 15 April 1968) is a Spanish boxer. He competed in the men's welterweight event at the 1988 Summer Olympics.

References

1968 births
Living people
Spanish male boxers
Olympic boxers of Spain
Boxers at the 1988 Summer Olympics
Place of birth missing (living people)
Welterweight boxers